Robert Inglis may refer to:

Sir Robert Inglis, 2nd Baronet (1786–1855), English Conservative politician
Rob Inglis (born 1933), audiobook narrator, actor and playwright
Bob Inglis (born 1959), American politician
Robert Inglis (railway engineer) (1881–1962), Scots-born railway engineer